The Lapiang Malaya (Filipino for "Freedom Movement" or "Freedom Party") was a fanatical political party in the Philippines during the 1950s to the 1960s. Led by Valentin de los Santos, he functioned as a cult leader.

Valentin de los Santos was a Bicolano and established Lapiang Malaya in the 1940s, building up its membership from the peasantry from Southern Luzon. He advocated true justice, true equality and true freedom in the country. His method of attaining his goals include communicating with the Bathala and Filipino heroes like Jose Rizal, linked the attainment of freedom with the Second Coming of Christ, and relied on amulets and prayers.

The party contested the 1957 presidential election with de los Santos and Restituto Fresto as their candidates for president and vice president, respectively. Both were defeated by incumbent Carlos P. Garcia, and Diosdado Macapagal, respectively, getting less than 0.50% of the vote. The party also contested the 1957 Senate election, although none of their candidates garnered enough votes to win seats in the Senate; with eight seats up for election and the country using plurality-at-large voting where each voter had eight votes and the eight candidates with the most votes are elected, the party's best candidate finished 41st with 8,915 votes, well behind the eighth-placed candidate which had 1,350,868 votes.

On May 21, 1967, the group plotted to overthrow the government of president Ferdinand Marcos. Armed with bolos and wearing amulets, the group composed of about 380 individuals wearing blue uniforms with red and yellow capes, marched to Malacañang Palace. They were stopped by the Philippine Constabulary, armed with M-16s, in Taft Avenue, Pasay. The group charged the ranks of the police and were shot at, leaving at least 33 dead and 47 wounded. The survivors and de los Santos were later arrested for sedition. De los Santos, instead of going to jail, was sent to the National Center for Mental Health since he was thought to be insane; most reports state that he was mauled and killed while in the hospital, while his supporters claim that he died peacefully past 80 years old at Nueva Vizcaya.

It was also in Nueva Vizcaya where his supporters lived in seclusion for forty years. The leadership was succeeded by Domingo De Guia, de los Santos' son-in-law, who became famous by having the power to heal and established "Vucal ng Pananampalataya", their community in the province. When Domingo died in 2005, he was succeeded by his son, Tal De Guia. In 2008, Tal held a lechon festival, whose purpose was "to continuously and slowly reintegrate our brethren to the mainstream." He further added that "We are not a bad people as some would like to picture us."

References

External links
Lapiang Malaya  at the Bantayog ng mga Bayani website

1967 in the Philippines
Defunct political parties in the Philippines
Political parties established in the 1940s
Political parties disestablished in 1967
History of the Philippines (1946–1965)
Millenarianism